Gender-affirming surgery for female-to-male transgender people includes a variety of surgical procedures that alter anatomical traits to provide physical traits more comfortable to the trans man's male identity and functioning.

Often used to refer to phalloplasty, metoidoplasty, or vaginectomy, sex reassignment surgery can also more broadly refer to many procedures an individual may have, such as male chest reconstruction, hysterectomy, or oophorectomy.

Gender-affirming surgery is usually preceded by beginning hormone treatment with testosterone.

Chest reconstruction 
Chest reconstruction ("top surgery") is an important component of transition in the transmasculine population that can substantially improve gender incongruence. This might be done as a step in the process of treating distress due to a difference between experienced or expressed gender and sex assigned at birth (gender dysphoria). The procedure can help transgender men transition physically to their self-affirmed gender. Surgeries for female-to-male transgender patients have similarities to both gynecomastia surgeries for cisgender men, breast reduction surgery for gigantomastia, and the separate mastectomies done for breast cancer.
Top surgery involves more than a mastectomy for the treatment of breast cancer. Special techniques are used to contour and reduce the chest wall, position the nipples and areola, and minimize scarring.

If the breast size is small, surgery that spares the skin, nipple and areola (subcutaneous nipple-sparing mastectomy) may be performed. This procedure minimizes scarring, has a faster healing time and usually preserves sensation in the nipples. During this surgery, incisions are made around the borders of the areolae and the surrounding skin. Breast tissue is removed through the incisions and some skin also might be removed. Remaining skin is reattached at the border of the areola.

Research suggests that most transgender men are satisfied with their surgical results, with only 1% experiencing regret after the operation.

Hysterectomy and bilateral salpingo-oophorectomy 
Hysterectomy is as surgical procedure performed to remove the uterus. A total hysterectomy involves removal of the uterus and cervix, and a sub-partial hysterectomy involves removal of only the uterus. Bilateral salpingo-oophorectomy (BSO) is the removal of both ovaries and fallopian tubes.

According to the ACOG, symptomatic uterine leiomyomas are the most common indication for hysterectomy in the US, followed by abnormal uterine bleeding, endometriosis and prolapse. Risk-reducing hysterectomy is also performed for patients with high-risk of endometrial cancer, including patients with germ-line BRCA1/2 mutations, Lynch Syndrome and family history. Hysterectomy can also be performed for male-identifying patients with uterus in conjunction with testosterone therapy.

Hysterectomy can be performed through three methods: abdominal, laparoscopic, vaginal. Abdominal hysterectomy is performed with incision into the abdominal wall, whereas laparoscopic and vaginal hysterectomies are minimally-invasive procedures. Current ACOG guidelines recommend minimally-invasive procedures, specifically vaginal hysterectomy, over surgical hysterectomy due to faster recovery time, shorter procedural time, shorter hospital stays and better quality of life. Discharge from minimally-invasive hysterectomy can occur as fast as 1 day post-operation, in contrast to 5 days post-operation for abdominal hysterectomies. Following discharge, patients often experience gastrointestinal symptoms such as constipation or urinary tract infections, as well as vaginal bleeding or discharge. These symptoms should be temporary and resolve within six weeks.  Follow-up visits with a gynecologist is recommended six-weeks following hysterectomy.

Follow-up care for male-identifying patients with uterus should still see a gynecologist for a check-up at least every three years. This is particularly the case for patients who:
 retain their vagina (whether before or after further genital reconstruction,)
 have a strong family history of cancers of the breast, ovary, or uterus (endometrium,)
 have a personal history of gynecological cancer or significant dysplasia on a Pap smear.
 develop vaginal bleeding post-operation and hormone therapy

Complications of hysterectomy involve infection, venous thromboembolic events, genitourinary and gastrointestinal tract injury and nerve injury. The most common of these complications is infection, which occurs at a rate of 10.5% of abdominal hysterectomy, 13% of vaginal hysterectomy and 9% of laparoscopic hysterectomy. There is also a low risk of long-term complications, which can include chronic pain, sexual dysfunction and bowel dysfunction.

Genital reassignment 

Also known as Genital reconstructive procedures (GRT)

Phalloplasty 

Phalloplasty is the process of constructing a neopenis using a flap (graft) from the patient's arm, thigh, abdomen, or back. Compared to Metoidioplasty, Phalloplasty provides a larger penis with a more satisfying cosmetic appearance; however, it is more expensive, and many times the penis lacks the ability to achieve an erection. Therefore, many tend to use penile implants to improve erection and get more satisfying cosmetic results. Sexual sensation is usually preserved to the base of the penis, where the original clitoris was.

Metoidioplasty 

Metoidioplasty is done after enlarging the clitoris using hormone replacement therapy, where a neopenis is constructed from the enlarged clitoris, with or without extending the urethra to allow urination while standing up. The labia majora are united to form a scrotum, where prosthetic testicles can be inserted. The new neophallus ranges in size from 4–10 cm (with an average of 5.7 cm) and has the approximate girth of a human adult thumb. Sexual sensation and erectile function are usually completely preserved. Specialized metoidioplasty penile implants may be an option in those who cannot achieve penetration during sex.

Penile implants 

Penile implants are usually used in phalloplasty surgery due to the inability of the neophallus to achieve proper erection. The penile implants are used in cisgender men to treat erectile dysfunction, and in transgender men during female-to-male sex reassignment surgery. Although the same penile implant has been used for both cisgender and transgender men, specialized penile implants for transgender men were recently developed by Zephyr Surgical Implants (Switzerland), in both inflatable and malleable models. During phalloplasty, the tissue flap used to build the neophallus is wrapped around the implant either in the same surgery, or in separate surgeries. Penile implants are less commonly used in metoidioplasty due to how the process is done.

Facial masculinization 
Facial masculinization also alters anatomical features to achieve an appearance that aligns more closely with gender identity. This can be achieved surgically, which might entail reconstruction of the forehead, nose, upper lip, or chin. Non-surgical options include injections to alter the jawline and chin. Non-surgical methods can be combined with surgery or used alone when subtle changes are desired. In addition to alteration of facial structure, hair transplantation can be used to achieve more permanent masculine hair growth patterns such as sideburns, mustaches, or beards.

See also

 Facial masculinization
 List of transgender-related topics
 Penile Implant
 Scrotoplasty
 Sex reassignment surgery (male-to-female)

Notes and references

Citations

General sources 
 Factors Which Influence Individual's Decisions When Considering Female-To-Male Genital Reconstructive Surgery by Katherine Rachlin from the International Journal of Transgenderism. Female-To-Male Genital Reconstructive Surgery. Factors, Benefits and Risks by Dr Preecha Tiewtranon This article also discusses some general issues of female-to-male GRT.

External links
 Everything you wanted to know about ... Total Abdominal Hysterectomy with Bilateral Salpingo Oophorectomy 

 
Surgical procedures and techniques